Thirsk Racecourse is a thoroughbred horse racing venue located in Thirsk, North Yorkshire, England. The course is a left handed oval of about 1 mile 2 furlongs with a 3 furlong finishing straight and a 6 furlong chute. The present course opened in 1923, but racing had taken place on the old course at nearby Black Hambleton over 200 years earlier.

The main road from Ripon to Thirsk runs past the course, and it is very popular with northern trainers.

In 1940 it staged the war-time substitute St. Leger.

Notable races
 Thirsk Hunt Cup

References

External links
Official website
Course guide on GG.COM
Course guide on At The Races

Horse racing venues in England
Horse racing venues in Yorkshire
Sports venues in North Yorkshire
Thirsk